Frontone is a comune (municipality) in the Province of Pesaro e Urbino in the Italian region of Marche, located about  west of Ancona and about  southwest of Pesaro.

Frontone borders the following municipalities: Cagli, Cantiano, Pergola, Scheggia e Pascelupo, Serra Sant'Abbondio.

The town is home to a Rocca (castle), designed, among the others, by Francesco di Giorgio Martini.

References

Cities and towns in the Marche